Glensted is an unincorporated community in Morgan County, in the U.S. state of Missouri.

History
A post office called Glensted was established in 1883, and remained in operation until 1955. The community's name is said to be a transfer from a place in Germany.

References

Unincorporated communities in Morgan County, Missouri
Unincorporated communities in Missouri